A by-election was to be held for the New South Wales Legislative Assembly electorate of Sydney City on 4 September 1856 because of the formation of the first Cowper ministry, with Charles Cowper appointed Colonial Secretary and Robert Campbell appointed Colonial Treasurer.

Dates

Result

Charles Cowper and Robert Campbell were appointed in the first Cowper ministry.

See also
Electoral results for the district of Sydney City
List of New South Wales state by-elections

References

1856 elections in Australia
New South Wales state by-elections
1850s in New South Wales